Drunella doddsii is a species of spiny crawler mayfly in the family Ephemerellidae.

References

Mayflies
Articles created by Qbugbot
Insects described in 1927